The Beatles Songbook is a compilation album by Italian singer Mina, released on 18 November 2022 by Warner Music Italy and PDU. The album features cover versions of songs by The Beatles recorded by Mina in different years.

Track listing

Charts

Release history

References

External links
 

2022 compilation albums
Mina (Italian singer) compilation albums
Warner Music Group compilation albums
The Beatles tribute albums